Norden-Norddeich Airfield is an airfield near the northwestern Norden borough of Norddeich in Lower Saxony, Germany. The airport serves regular flights to airports on the islands of Norderney and Juist. It is also home to a flying club, which operates two aircraft from a hangar on the airfield's east side.

Airlines and destinations
The following airlines offer regular scheduled and charter flights from Norden-Norddeich Airfield:

References

Airports in Lower Saxony

External links